Saadatabad-e Sofla (also Romanized as Sa‘ādatābād-e Soflā; also known as Sa‘ādatābād-e Pā’īn) is a village in Rahmat Rural District, Seyyedan District, Marvdasht County, Fars Province, Iran. At the 2006 census, its population was 195, in 43 families.

References 

Populated places in Marvdasht County